Handağı is a village in the Pazar District, Rize Province, in Black Sea Region of Turkey. Its population is 254 (2021).

History 
According to list of villages in Laz language book (2009), name of the village is Dadivati, which means "village of aunt". Most villagers are ethnically Laz.

Geography

References

Villages in Pazar District, Rize
Laz settlements in Turkey